Burum-Kwat Rural LLG (also spelled Burum-Kuat) is a local-level government (LLG) of Morobe Province, Papua New Guinea.

Wards
01. Kotken
02. Zengaring
03. Numbut
04. Ubanong
05. Koire
06. Songolok
07. Nomaneneng
08. Sagiro
09. Ogeranang
10. Serembeng
11. Origenang
12. Manimbu
13. Wamoki
14. Ebabang
15. Hamoronong
16. Sangararang
17. Tumnong
18. Mindik
19. Satneng
20. Wagang
21. Tobou
22. Lengbatti
23. Awengu
24. Sasiu

References

Local-level governments of Morobe Province